Matea Sumajstorčić (born 5 April 1999) is a Croatian swimmer. She represented Croatia at the 2019 World Aquatics Championships held in Gwangju, South Korea. She competed in the women's 800 metre freestyle and women's 1500 metre freestyle events. In both events she did not advance to compete in the final.

References

External links
 

1999 births
Living people
Croatian female swimmers
Place of birth missing (living people)
Croatian female freestyle swimmers
Swimmers at the 2015 European Games
European Games competitors for Croatia
20th-century Croatian women
21st-century Croatian women